En Mana Vaanil is a 2002 Indian Tamil language romantic drama film written and directed by Vinayan and is a remake of his own Malayalam film Oomappenninu Uriyadappayyan (2002). The film stars Jayasurya, Kavya Madhavan who were part of original film, making their debut in Tamil cinema with this film. Vadivelu and Vijayakumar appear in supporting roles.

Plot 

A poor mute man Ganesh and a rich deaf-mute girl Thilaka fall in love. Their love supported by Ganesh's family but is opposed with a vengeance by Thilaka's family. At the same time, Thilaka is pursued by other suitors who are only after her money. Ganesh and Thilaka flee their hometown together, pursued by Thilaka's uncle and suitor. Will their love succeed?

Cast 

Jayasurya as Ganesh
Kavya Madhavan as Thilaka
Vadivelu as Govindan
Chandrasekhar as Blind street singer
Mansoor Ali Khan as Gajendran
Vijayakumar as Rajarathnam, Thilaka's father
Manivannan as Annamalai
Rajeev as Parthasarathy
Charle as Paramasivam
Vaiyapuri as Azhagusundaram
Thadi Balaji as Vikram Singh
Sanjeev as Velu
Ajay Rathnam as Police inspector
Bava Lakshmanan as Nomad
Kovai Sarala as Parvathi
Sabitha Anand as Ganesh's mother
Ramya
Karthika Mathew as Sumathi, Ganesh's sister
Deepu as Nomad
Indrajith Sukumaran as Murali
Anu Anand as Mahesh
R. S. Shivaji
Beena Sabu
Vandar Kuzhazhi Smitha as Prostitute
Shirley Das as Prostitute

Soundtrack 
Soundtrack was composed by Ilaiyaraaja.

Reception 
Sify called it "the most idiotic and lamebrain film made in recent times"; however the critic noted "The silver lining on the otherwise intolerable film is the melodious songs tuned by Illayaraja". Malathi Rangarajan of The Hindu wrote, "Too much of mental and physical trauma on screen could only leave the viewer weary and exasperated". Visual Dasan of Kalki called it the age old story of lovers on the run but praised Ilayaraja's background score and Jayasurya's acting.

References

External links 
 

2000s Tamil-language films
2002 films
2002 romantic drama films
Films directed by Vinayan
Films scored by Ilaiyaraaja
Indian romantic drama films
Tamil remakes of Malayalam films